The GNC Grip Gauntlet (officially the GNC Pro Performance Grip Gauntlet) is a strength athletics contest that tests the grip strength of competing individuals over three disciplines, each designed to test one of the three recognised facets of hand strength: crushing; pinching; and supporting. It was developed by Wade and Brad Gillingham and became an internationally recognised contest featured at some of the world's most prominent strength athletics events and expos, including the Arnold Strongman Classic and the various WSM Super Series Grand Prixs.  The last time the GNC Grip Gauntlet was run in a competitive format was the 2010 Arnold Classic.  Since that time the challenge has changed to an informal challenge with no official results maintained.  Prizes are still awarded for successful completion of the challenge.

History
In 2002 Wade and Brad Gillingham (GNC Pro Performance Sponsored Athletes) and General Nutrition Center (GNC) introduced The Blob Challenge in the GNC booth at the Mr. Olympia in Las Vegas, NV.  The Blob Challenge was run in the GNC booth at 4 events from 2002 - 2003.  Late in 2003 Wade and Brad Gillingham wanting to expand the challenge came up with the idea to test 3 main facets of grip strength: Crushing Strength, Pinching Strength, and Supporting Strength.  Upon approval from GNC to expand the challenge Wade approached Randall Strossen from IronMind to get permission to use Captains of Crush grippers as part of the challenge.  In conversation with Randall it was decided that Wade and Brad's original idea to use a Thomas Inch Dumbbell replica for the supporting grip challenge should be replaced with the IronMind Rolling Thunder.  The GNC Pro Performance Grip Gauntlet debuted at the 2004 Arnold Expo Challenge. The three implements used were the No. 3 Captains of Crush gripper, the Rolling Thunder, and an implement called the Blob. Cash prizes were available for succeeding with all three elements of the challenge.  An estimated 20,000 competitors at Fitness Expos over a 7-year run from 2004 to 2010 tested their hands at the GNC Grip Gauntlet.

As to the stature of the Gauntlet, Gillingham is quoted as saying in 2008: "If you think this challenge isn't world class, think again. Over the past four years, an estimated 10,000 attempts have been made to complete the three challenges on the GNC Grip Gauntlet stage and only two individuals have ever completed all three in the ‘heavy’ format."

The Gauntlet eventually settled on three formats, Light, Medium and Heavy. In early 2009, the weight of the Rolling Thunder was dropped from 212 lbs to 207 lbs, to correspond with Ironmind's new version of the Rolling Thunder.  In 2010 due to changes in the Rolling Thunder and a change from Captain's of Crush grippers to the new GNC Pro Performance Hand Grippers, it was decided by Wade Gillingham that the historical integrity of the event was not longer sound enough to continue compiling a list of winners.

Disciplines
The disciplines of crushing, pinching and supporting are tested. Crushing, uses the IronMind Captains of Crush grippers. Supporting is tested using IronMind Rolling Thunder. Pinching (or pinch gripping) uses the Blob.

Rolling Thunder
Although often referred as a part of the GNC Grip Gauntlet, the Rolling Thunder's history goes back more than a decade before the Gauntlet first existed. IronMind developed the Rolling Thunder in 1993 and it is now known by strong men worldwide. One-hand deadlifts had long been a preferred means of testing and building grip strength and Rolling Thunder itself is a thick revolving deadlift handle (length: 7 1/2" (rotating portion is 6") and diameter: 2 3/8") to which can be attached weights. Such is the rise of its popularity that Rolling Thunder competitions are often held in conjunction with major strongman events including the Mohegan Sun Grand Prix 2008 and the Hawaii-based Beauty and the Beast Strongman Contests. As part of the GNC Grip Gauntlet it is also seen around the world at expos. Early on in its history, in 1993, Ironmind issued a challenge to the world of strongmen to lift 300 lbs with Rolling Thunder, and it took 15 years for this challenge to be met when Mark Felix performed the feat at the Mohegan Sun Grand Prix 2008, in the process becoming Rolling Thunder World Champion. In May 2009 Felix defended his Mohegan Sun title, although this was not considered the world championships. He defended the world title in June 2009 in Quebec as a lead-in event to the Fortissimus championships.

150 kg barrier and the World Record
On July 30, 2013 Russia's Alexey Tyukalov managed to officially lift  at the A1 Armwrestling Tournament, Moscow and officially broke the world record and also became the first man to officially break the 150 kg barrier.

Men's world record progression

Men's World Championships

Women's world record progression

Notes:

External links
GNC Grip Gauntlet Chronological List of Successful Competitors

References

Strongmen competitions